Danilo Talanskas (born 1950) is the managing director of Otis Elevator Company.

Talanskas got an undergraduate degree at the Mackenzie University in São Paulo.  He then received an MBA from the Marriott School of Management at Brigham Young University.  His parents immigrated from Lithuania to Brazil.

Prior to taking his position with Otis, Talanskas worked for General Electric and Black and Decker.  He also served as Brazilian chairman for Rockwell Automotive.

Talanskas is a member of the Church of Jesus Christ of Latter-day Saints.  He served as president of the São Paulo Brazil Santo Amaro Stake.  From 1992 to 1995 he was a Regional Representative of the Twelve and from 1981 to 1984 was a mission president in Rio de Janeiro, Brazil.

In 2007, Talanskas was made a member of the Board of Local managers to advise the University of Pittsburgh on developing a program that would serve the needs of Brazilian MBA students.

Sources 
 Church News, April 4, 1992; April 18, 1992.
 Marriott Magazine article on Talanskas

References 

1950 births
Brazilian Mormon missionaries
Brazilian people of Lithuanian descent
Mackenzie Presbyterian University alumni
Marriott School of Management alumni
Living people
Mission presidents (LDS Church)
Mormon missionaries in Brazil
Otis Worldwide
Regional representatives of the Twelve
20th-century Mormon missionaries
Brazilian leaders of the Church of Jesus Christ of Latter-day Saints
20th-century American businesspeople